In mathematics, the Bianchi classification provides a list of all real 3-dimensional Lie algebras (up to isomorphism).  The classification contains 11 classes, 9 of which contain a single Lie algebra and two of which contain a continuum-sized family of Lie algebras. (Sometimes two of the groups are included in the infinite families, giving 9 instead of 11 classes.)  The classification is important in geometry and physics, because the associated Lie groups serve as symmetry groups of 3-dimensional Riemannian manifolds.  It is named for Luigi Bianchi, who worked it out in 1898.

The term "Bianchi classification" is also used for similar classifications in other dimensions and for classifications of complex Lie algebras.

Classification in dimension less than 3 

 Dimension 0: The only Lie algebra is the abelian Lie algebra R0.
 Dimension 1: The only Lie algebra is the abelian Lie algebra R1, with outer automorphism group the multiplicative group of non-zero real numbers.
 Dimension 2: There are two Lie algebras:
 (1) The abelian Lie algebra R2, with outer automorphism group GL2(R).
 (2) The solvable Lie algebra of 2×2 upper triangular matrices of trace 0. It has trivial center and trivial outer automorphism group.  The associated simply connected Lie group is  the affine group of the line.

Classification in dimension 3

All the 3-dimensional Lie algebras other than types VIII and IX can be constructed as a semidirect product of R2 and R, with R acting on R2 by some 2 by 2 matrix M. The different types correspond to different types of matrices M, as described below.

Type I: This is the abelian and unimodular Lie algebra R3. The simply connected group has center R3 and outer automorphism group GL3(R). This is the case when M is 0.
Type II: The Heisenberg algebra, which is nilpotent and unimodular. The simply connected group has center R and outer automorphism group GL2(R). This is the case when M is nilpotent but not 0 (eigenvalues all 0).
Type III: This algebra is a product of R and the 2-dimensional non-abelian Lie algebra.  (It is a limiting case of type VI, where one eigenvalue becomes zero.) It is solvable and not unimodular. The simply connected group has center R and outer automorphism group the group of non-zero real numbers. The matrix M has one zero and one non-zero eigenvalue.
Type IV: The algebra generated by [y,z] = 0, [x,y] = y, [x, z] = y + z. It is solvable and not unimodular. The simply connected group has trivial center and outer automorphism group the product of the reals and a group of order 2. The matrix M has two equal non-zero eigenvalues, but is not diagonalizable.
Type V: [y,z] = 0, [x,y] = y, [x, z] = z. Solvable and not unimodular. (A limiting case of type VI where both eigenvalues are equal.) The simply connected group has trivial center and outer automorphism group the elements of GL2(R) of determinant +1 or −1. The matrix M has two equal eigenvalues, and is diagonalizable.
Type VI: An infinite family: semidirect products of R2 by R, where the matrix M has non-zero distinct real eigenvalues with non-zero sum. The algebras are solvable and not unimodular. The simply connected group has trivial center and outer automorphism group a product of  the non-zero real numbers and a group of order 2.
Type VI0: This Lie algebra is the semidirect product of R2 by R, with R where the matrix M has non-zero distinct real eigenvalues with zero sum. It is solvable and unimodular.  It is the Lie algebra of the 2-dimensional Poincaré group, the group of isometries of 2-dimensional Minkowski space. The simply connected group has trivial center and outer automorphism group the product of the positive real numbers with the dihedral group of order 8.
Type VII: An infinite family: semidirect products of R2 by R, where the matrix M has non-real and non-imaginary eigenvalues. Solvable and not unimodular. The simply connected group has trivial center and outer automorphism group the non-zero reals.
Type VII0: Semidirect product of R2 by R, where the matrix M has  non-zero imaginary eigenvalues.  Solvable and unimodular.  This is the Lie algebra of the group of isometries of the plane. The simply connected group has center Z and outer automorphism group a product of  the non-zero real numbers and a group of order 2.
Type VIII: The Lie algebra sl2(R) of traceless 2 by 2 matrices, associated to the group SL2(R). It is simple and unimodular.
Type IX: The Lie algebra of the orthogonal group O3(R). It is denoted by 𝖘𝖔(3) and is simple and unimodular. The corresponding simply connected group is SU(2); it has center of order 2 and trivial outer automorphism group, and is a spin group.

The classification of 3-dimensional complex Lie algebras is similar except that types VIII and IX become isomorphic, and types VI and VII both become part of a single family of Lie algebras.

The connected 3-dimensional Lie groups can be classified as follows: they are a quotient of the corresponding simply connected Lie group by a discrete subgroup of the center, so can be read off from the table above.

The groups are related to the 8 geometries of Thurston's geometrization conjecture. More precisely, seven of the 8 geometries can be realized as a left-invariant metric on the simply connected group (sometimes in more than one way). The Thurston geometry of type S2×R cannot be realized in this way.

Structure constants
The three-dimensional Bianchi spaces each admit a set of three Killing vector fields  which obey the following property:

where , the "structure constants" of the group, form a constant order-three tensor antisymmetric in its lower two indices. For any three-dimensional Bianchi space,  is given by the relationship

The standard Bianchi classification can be derived from the structural constants in the following six steps:
Due to the antisymmetry , there are nine independent constants . These can be equivalently represented by the nine components of an arbitrary constant matrix Cab:  where εabd is the totally antisymmetric three-dimensional Levi-Civita symbol (ε123 = 1). Substitution of this expression for  into the Jacobi identity, results in 
The structure constants can be transformed as:Appearance of det A in this formula is due to the fact that the symbol εabd transforms as tensor density: , where έmnd ≡ εmnd. By this transformation it is always possible to reduce the matrix Cab to the form:After such a choice, one still have the freedom of making triad transformations but with the restrictions  and 
Now, the Jacobi identities give only one constraint:
ThenThe diagonality condition for Cab is preserved under the transformations with diagonal . Under these transformations, the three parameters n1, n2, n3 change in the following way:By these diagonal transformations, the modulus of any na (if it is not zero) can be made equal to unity. Taking into account that the simultaneous change of sign of all na produce nothing new, one arrives to the following invariantly different sets for the numbers n1, n2, n3 (invariantly different in the sense that there is no way to pass from one to another by some transformation of the triad ), that is to the following different types of homogeneous spaces with diagonal matrix Cab:
Consider now the case n1 = 0. It can also happen in that case that C23 – C32 = 0. This returns to the situation already analyzed in the previous step but with the additional condition n1 = 0. Now, all essentially different types for the sets n1, n2, n3 are (0, 1, 1), (0, 1, −1), (0, 0, 1) and (0, 0, 0). The first three repeat the types VII0, VI0, II. Consequently, only one new type arises:
The only case left is n1 = 0 and C23 – C32 ≠ 0. Now the 2 × 2 matrix  is non-symmetric and it cannot be made diagonal by transformations using . However, its symmetric part can be diagonalized, that is the 3 × 3 matrix Cab can be reduced to the form:where a is an arbitrary number. After this is done, there still remains the possibility to perform transformations with diagonal , under which the quantities n2, n3 and a change as follows:These formulas show that for nonzero n2, n3, a, the combination a2(n2n3)−1 is an invariant quantity. For the second two possibilities, both of these parameters are already fixed and a remains an invariant and arbitrary positive number. Historically these four types of homogeneous spaces have been classified as:Type III is just a particular case of type VI corresponding to a = 1. Types VII and VI contain an infinity of invariantly different types of algebras corresponding to the arbitrariness of the continuous parameter a. Type VII0 is a particular case of VII corresponding to a = 0 while type VI0 is a particular case of VI corresponding also to a = 0.

Curvature of Bianchi spaces
The Bianchi spaces have the property that their Ricci tensors can be separated into a product of the basis vectors associated with the space and a coordinate-independent tensor.

For a given metric:

(where 　are 1-forms), the Ricci curvature tensor  is given by:

Cosmological application 
In cosmology, this classification is used for a homogeneous spacetime of dimension 3+1. The 3-dimensional Lie group is as the symmetry group of  the 3-dimensional spacelike slice, and the Lorentz metric satisfying the Einstein equation is generated by varying the metric components as a function of t. The Friedmann–Lemaître–Robertson–Walker metrics are isotropic, which are particular cases of types I, V,  and IX. The Bianchi type I models include the Kasner metric  as a special case.
The Bianchi IX cosmologies include the Taub metric. However, the dynamics near the singularity is approximately governed by a series of successive Kasner (Bianchi I) periods. The complicated dynamics,
which essentially amounts to billiard motion in a portion of hyperbolic space, exhibits chaotic behaviour, and is named Mixmaster; its analysis is referred to as the BKL analysis after Belinskii, Khalatnikov and Lifshitz.
More recent work has established a relation of (super-)gravity theories near a spacelike singularity (BKL-limit) with Lorentzian Kac–Moody algebras, Weyl groups and hyperbolic Coxeter groups.
Other more recent work is concerned with the discrete nature of the Kasner map and a continuous generalisation. In a space that is both homogeneous and isotropic the metric is determined completely, leaving free only the sign of the curvature. Assuming only space homogeneity with no additional symmetry such as isotropy leaves considerably more freedom in choosing the metric. The following pertains to the space part of the metric at a given instant of time t assuming a synchronous frame so that t is the same synchronised time for the whole space.

Homogeneity implies identical metric properties at all points of the space. An exact definition of this concept involves considering sets of coordinate transformations that transform the space into itself, i.e. leave its metric unchanged: if the line element before transformation is

then after transformation the same line element is

with the same functional dependence of γαβ on the new coordinates. (For a more theoretical and coordinate-independent definition of homogeneous space see homogeneous space). A space is homogeneous if it admits a set of transformations (a group of motions) that brings any given point to the position of any other point. Since space is three-dimensional the different transformations of the group are labelled by three independent parameters.

In Euclidean space the homogeneity of space is expressed by the invariance of the metric under parallel displacements (translations) of the Cartesian coordinate system. Each translation is determined by three parameters — the components of the displacement vector of the coordinate origin. All these transformations leave invariant the three independent differentials (dx, dy, dz) from which the line element is constructed. In the general case of a non-Euclidean homogeneous space, the transformations of its group of motions again leave invariant three independent linear differential forms, which do not, however, reduce to total differentials of any coordinate functions. These forms are written as  where the Latin index (a) labels three independent vectors (coordinate functions); these vectors are called a frame field or triad. The Greek letters label the three space-like curvilinear coordinates. A spatial metric invariant is constructed under the given group of motions with the use of the above forms: 

i.e. the metric tensor is

where the coefficients ηab, which are symmetric in the indices a and b, are functions of time. The choice of basis vectors is dictated by the symmetry properties of the space and, in general, these basis vectors are not orthogonal (so that the matrix ηab is not diagonal).

The reciprocal triple of vectors  is introduced with the help of Kronecker delta

In the three-dimensional case, the relation between the two vector triples can be written explicitly

where the volume v is

The determinant of the metric tensor  is γ = ηv2 where η is the determinant of the matrix ηab.

The required conditions for the homogeneity of the space are

The constants  are called the structure constants of the group.
{| class="toccolours collapsible collapsed" width="80%" style="text-align:left"
!Proof of 
|-
|
The invariance of the differential forms  means that

These equations are a system of differential equations that determine the functions  for a given frame. In order to be integrable, these equations must satisfy identically the conditions

Calculating the derivatives, one finds

and for the right, the same expression in the variable x. Since x and x are arbitrary, these expression must reduce to constants to obtain .
|}
 
 can be written in a vector form as

where again the vector operations are done as if the coordinates xα were Cartesian. Using , one obtains

and six more equations obtained by a cyclic permutation of indices 1, 2, 3.

The structure constants are antisymmetric in their lower indices as seen from their definition : . Another condition on the structure constants can be obtained by noting that  can be written in the form of commutation relations

for the linear differential operators

In the mathematical theory of continuous groups (Lie groups) the operators Xa satisfying conditions  are called the generators of the group. The theory of Lie groups uses operators defined using the Killing vectors  instead of triads . Since in the synchronous metric none of the γαβ components depends on time, the Killing vectors (triads) are time-like.

The conditions  follow from the Jacobi identity

and have the form

It is a definite advantage to use, in place of the three-index constants , a set of two-index quantities, obtained by the dual transformation

where eabc = eabc is the unit antisymmetric symbol (with e123 = +1). With these constants the commutation relations  are written as

The antisymmetry property is already taken into account in the definition , while property  takes the form

The choice of the three frame vectors in the differential forms  (and with them the operators Xa) is not unique. They can be subjected to any linear transformation with constant coefficients:

The quantities ηab and Cab behave like tensors (are invariant) with respect to such transformations.

The conditions  are the only ones that the structure constants must satisfy. But among the constants admissible by these conditions, there are equivalent sets, in the sense that their difference is related to a transformation of the type . The question of the classification of homogeneous spaces reduces to determining all nonequivalent sets of structure constants. This can be done, using the "tensor" properties of the quantities Cab, by the following simple method (C. G. Behr, 1962).

The asymmetric tensor Cab can be resolved into a symmetric and an antisymmetric part. The first is denoted by nab, and the second is expressed in terms of its dual vector ac:

Substitution of this expression in  leads to the condition

By means of the transformations  the symmetric tensor nab can be brought to diagonal form with eigenvalues n1, n2, n3. Equation  shows that the vector ab (if it exists) lies along one of the principal directions of the tensor nab, the one corresponding to the eigenvalue zero. Without loss of generality one can therefore set ab = (a, 0, 0). Then  reduces to an1 = 0, i.e. one of the quantities a or n1 must be zero. The Jacobi identities take the form:

The only remaining freedoms are sign changes of the operators Xa and their multiplication by arbitrary constants. This permits to simultaneously change the sign of all the na and also to make the quantity a positive (if it is different from zero). Also all structure constants can be made equal to ±1, if at least one of the quantities a, n2, n3 vanishes. But if all three of these quantities differ from zero, the scale transformations leave invariant the ratio h = a2(n2n3)−1.

Thus one arrives at the Bianchi classification listing the possible types of homogeneous spaces classified by the values of a, n1, n2, n3 which is graphically presented in Fig. 3. In the class A case (a = 0), type IX (n(1)=1, n(2)=1, n(3)=1) is represented by octant 2, type VIII (n(1)=1, n(2)=1, n(3)=–1) is represented by octant 6, while type VII0 (n(1)=1, n(2)=1, n(3)=0) is represented by the first quadrant of the horizontal plane and type VI0 (n(1)=1, n(2)=–1, n(3)=0) is represented by the fourth quadrant of this plane; type II ((n(1)=1, n(2)=0, n(3)=0) is represented by the interval [0,1] along n(1) and type I (n(1)=0, n(2)=0, n(3)=0) is at the origin. Similarly in the class B case (with n(3) = 0), Bianchi type VIh (a=h, n(1)=1, n(2)=–1) projects to the fourth quadrant of the horizontal plane and type VIIh (a=h, n(1)=1, n(2)=1) projects to the first quadrant of the horizontal plane; these last two types are a single isomorphism class corresponding to a constant value surface of the function h = a2(n(1)n(2))−1. A typical such surface is illustrated in one octant, the angle θ given by tan θ = |h/2|1/2; those in the remaining octants are obtained by rotation through multiples of π/2, h alternating in sign for a given magnitude |h|. Type III is a subtype of VIh with a=1. Type V (a=1, n(1)=0, n(2)=0) is the interval (0,1] along the axis a and type IV''' (a=1, n(1)=1, n(2)=0) is the vertical open face between the first and fourth quadrants of the a = 0 plane with the latter giving the class A limit of each type.

The Einstein equations for a universe with a homogeneous space can reduce to a system of ordinary differential equations containing only functions of time with the help of a frame field. To do this one must resolve the spatial components of four-vectors and four-tensors along the triad of basis vectors of the space:

where all these quantities are now functions of t alone; the scalar quantities, the energy density ε and the pressure of the matter p, are also functions of the time.

The Einstein equations in vacuum in synchronous reference frame are

where  is the 3-dimensional tensor , and Pαβ is the 3-dimensional Ricci tensor, which is expressed by the 3-dimensional metric tensor γαβ in the same way as Rik is expressed by gik; Pαβ contains only the space (but not the time) derivatives of γαβ. Using triads, for  one has simply

The components of P(a)(b) can be expressed in terms of the quantities ηab and the structure constants of the group by using the tetrad representation of the Ricci tensor in terms of quantities 

After replacing the three-index symbols  by two-index symbols Cab and the transformations:

one gets the "homogeneous" Ricci tensor expressed in structure constants:

Here, all indices are raised and lowered with the local metric tensor ηab

The Bianchi identities for the three-dimensional tensor Pαβ in the homogeneous space take the form

Taking into account the transformations of covariant derivatives for arbitrary four-vectors Ai and four-tensors Aik

the final expressions for the triad components of the Ricci four-tensor are:

In setting up the Einstein equations there is thus no need to use explicit expressions for the basis vectors as functions of the coordinates.

See also

Table of Lie groups
List of simple Lie groups
BKL singularity

Notes

References

Bibliography

L. Bianchi, Sugli spazi a tre dimensioni che ammettono un gruppo continuo di movimenti. (On the spaces of three dimensions that admit a continuous group of movements.) Soc. Ital. Sci. Mem. di Mat. 11, 267 (1898) English translation 

Guido Fubini Sugli spazi a quattro dimensioni che ammettono un gruppo continuo di movimenti, (On the spaces of four dimensions that admit a continuous group of movements.) Ann. Mat. pura appli. (3) 9, 33-90 (1904); reprinted in Opere Scelte, a cura dell'Unione matematica italiana e col contributo del Consiglio nazionale delle ricerche, Roma Edizioni Cremonese, 1957–62
MacCallum, On the classification of the real four-dimensional Lie algebras'', in "On Einstein's path: essays in honor of Engelbert Schucking" edited by A. L. Harvey, Springer 

Robert T. Jantzen, Bianchi classification of 3-geometries: original papers in translation

 Vol. 2 of the Course of Theoretical Physics
; English translation in 

Lie algebras
Lie groups
Physical cosmology